The Clipper card is a reloadable contactless smart card used for automated fare collection in the San Francisco Bay Area. First introduced as TransLink in 2002 by the Metropolitan Transportation Commission (MTC) as a pilot program, it was rebranded in its current form on June 16, 2010. Like other transit smart cards such as the Oyster card, the Clipper card is a credit card-sized stored-value card capable of holding both cash value and transit passes for the participating transit agencies. In addition to the traditional plastic card, Clipper is available as a virtual card in Google Wallet and Apple Wallet. Clipper is accepted by nearly all public transit services in the Bay Area, including but not limited to Muni, BART, Caltrain, AC Transit, SamTrans, Golden Gate Transit, Golden Gate Ferry, San Francisco Bay Ferry, and VTA.

History

In 1993, Bay Area Rapid Transit (BART) and County Connection launched a pilot program named Translink (not to be confused with other agencies with that name) that allowed the use of a single fare card between the two systems. The card, which used magnetic stripe technology, was envisioned to one day include all Bay Area transit agencies. However, because of technical problems, the program was abandoned two years later.

Translink had a projected capital cost of $4 million when undertaken in 1993. In its current form, first as TransLink and later as Clipper, implementation was expected to cost $30 million. Cost estimates have since increased; in 2008, the projected 25-year capital and operations costs were estimated at $338 million.

Implementation took more than a decade. In 1998, MTC envisioned full availability of TransLink by 2001. However, it was fully operational for only five transit agencies by 2009; only 7 agencies by January 2012, 8 in January 2013, 13 by March 2015, finally reaching 20 agencies by March 2016. As of October 2022, the card can be used on 24 agencies, unlocking bike shares, and validating BART parking.

TransLink was developed by Australian-based ERG Group and Motorola under the ERG-Motorola alliance in April 1999. However, upon the launch of Clipper, Cubic Transportation Systems took over administration of distribution, customer service, and financial settlement of the program.

On , MTC changed the TransLink name to Clipper, an homage to the clipper ships of the 19th century, the fastest way to travel from the East Coast to San Francisco, and eliminated the contact interface which had been used to load funds onto the cards at TransLink machines.

In October 2010, the MTC selected 路路通 (Pinyin: Lùlùtōng, the "Go Everywhere Card", lit. "every transit route/line pass") as the official Chinese name for Clipper. In Spanish it is known as "tarjeta Clipper".

In 2014, the MTC started an initiative to design the next generation version of the Clipper system, nicknamed "C2" or "Clipper 2.0". The  contract with Cubic for the existing Clipper system expired in 2019, and the system architecture dates from the 1990s. These factors led the MTC to start developing a next generation system planned to begin operation in 2021. The new system was specified to include a mobile app as well as integration with digital wallets. The upgrade was planned to be funded in part by $50 million from Regional Measure 3, a bridge toll increase approved in June 2018, but the funds from the measure are on hold due to a lawsuit.

In December 2020, BART announced that it had converted all of its ticket machines to Clipper-only, discontinuing the sale of paper magstripe tickets that had been used since the system's inception in the 1970s. Existing paper tickets remain valid and add-fare machines inside the paid area of each station can be used to add fare to paper tickets if they have insufficient fare remaining to exit at the station in question.

On April 15, 2021, Clipper became available in Apple Wallet, and the Clipper mobile app for iOS was released. Integration with Google Pay and an Android app were released on May 19, 2021.

In March 2022, Clipper announced that its older card readers were to be replaced soon, and that the new readers would not be backwards-compatible with TransLink cards.

As part of efforts to integrate the fare systems of Bay Area transit agencies, the Clipper Bay Pass pilot program was announced in August 2022. The Bay Pass provides free unlimited rides on Clipper-enabled transit systems to a subset of students at participating educational institutions. The program is planned to expand to other institutions, such as businesses and non-profits, in 2023.

Usage

Cost of card
Obtaining a card was free from introduction in June 2010 to encourage users to adopt the card, until September 1, 2012 when new adult cards began to cost $3.  This charge covers the cost (approximately $2) to manufacture each card, helps cover operating expenses, and reduces the incentive to throw away the card if the value goes negative when fare is calculated on exit. The $3 fee is waived if the card is registered for Autoload at the time of purchase (in which case it cannot go negative). There is no fee to transfer plastic Clipper cards to mobile wallets. The $3 fee for new virtual cards in mobile wallets was waived for the first six months following launch but came into effect on October 15, 2021. The fee was temporarily waived again beginning in March 2022 due to supply chain issues reducing the availability of plastic cards.

Adding money and transit passes

Passengers can add money and transit passes to their Clipper cards in person ("at participating retailers, participating transit agencies' ticket vending machines and ticket offices, Clipper Customer Service Centers, and Clipper Add Value Machines") at work, automatically, online, or using the Clipper mobile app. While money and passes added in person are available to use immediately, doing the same by telephone, online, or using the mobile app may take 3–5 days to register on a physical Clipper card. Cash value and passes added online or via the mobile app to virtual Clipper cards in Google Pay or Apple Wallet are available for immediate use, except for BART High-Value Discount tickets; these are available by the following day.

Transit services
Clipper is currently accepted on 24 Bay Area transit services:
 AC Transit
 Bay Area Rapid Transit (BART)
 Caltrain
 County Connection
Dumbarton Express
 FAST
 Golden Gate Bridge, Highway and Transportation District
Golden Gate Transit
Golden Gate Ferry
 Marin Transit
 Petaluma Transit
 SamTrans
 San Francisco Municipal Railway (Muni)
 Santa Clara Valley Transportation Authority (VTA)
 Santa Rosa CityBus
 San Francisco Bay Ferry
 SolTrans (including SolanoExpress)
 Sonoma County Transit
 Sonoma–Marin Area Rail Transit (SMART)
 Tri-Delta Transit
 Union City Transit
 Vacaville City Coach
 VINE
 WestCAT
 Wheels

A number of smaller regional transit agencies have not yet joined Clipper, including ACE and Rio Vista Delta Breeze. Clipper is not accepted on Amtrak California's Capitol Corridor or San Joaquins trains, despite these serving the Bay Area.

Differences between transit services
The fare rules for each participating transit service are set by the agency operating the service, not by Clipper. Each service has differing rules that approximate the fare collection rules used by that service prior to Clipper adoption, and are adapted to the needs of that service. For example, Golden Gate Transit uses a zone-based fare system, so it requires passengers to tag on when boarding and tag off when alighting; in contrast, San Francisco’s Muni has a flat fare structure so it only requires that passengers tag on when boarding.

Other uses 
Clipper cards are accepted by Bay Wheels, the Bay Area's bikeshare system, as well as some electronic bicycle lockers operated by BikeLink. For each of these systems, the Clipper card is used not for payment but only as a key; users must have a credit or debit card linked to their Bay Wheels or BikeLink account, and usage fees are charged to this linked payment card, not deducted from the Clipper card's stored value. These systems are not compatible with mobile wallets such as Google Pay or Apple Pay; only physical Clipper cards may be used.

Beginning in 2013, a few parking garages in the Bay Area accepted Clipper for payment as part of a pilot program. Funds used for parking were kept separate from those used for transit. This program was discontinued effective September 1, 2017.

Technology

Clipper cards contain an NXP Semiconductors MIFARE DESFire (MF3ICD40) or MIFARE DESFire EV1 (MF3ICD41) integrated circuit inside the card. The card operates on the 13.56 MHz range, putting it into the Near-Field Communication category. Because the card uses NFC technology, any NFC-enabled device can read the serial number, travel history, and current balance on the card.  However, data cannot be written to the card without the proper encryption key, preventing unauthorized access to funds on the card. The former TransLink cards, while still functional on the fare system readers, do not conform to MIFARE and are unreadable by 13.56 MHz readers.

Because Clipper operates in multiple geographical areas with sporadic or non-existent internet access, the fare collection and verification technology needs to operate without any networking. To accomplish this, the Clipper card memory keeps track of balance on the card, fares paid, and trip history. This also means if funds are added to the Clipper account via the internet, funds will not show up on the Clipper card until it has been tagged at an internet-enabled (or recently synchronized) Clipper payment terminal. Buses and other vehicles without internet access will have to return to a service station in order to synchronize with Clipper's servers. During synchronization, the payment collection device will upload to the server data about any fares collected, and will download information about new funds and passes added online or over the phone. Riders who tag their card at a recently synchronized payment collection device will have their card updated to reflect their true account balance.

The waiting period between synchronizations may cause some cards to report lower funds than are actually on the corresponding Clipper account. In order to alleviate this problem, Clipper allows riders to go as low as -$11.25 on the card before funds need to be added.

Mobile wallets 
On April 15, 2021, the Clipper mobile app for iOS was released, and Clipper became available in Apple Wallet, joining other transit cards such as Suica, Pasmo, and TAP. Supported devices include iPhone 8 or later and Apple Watch Series 3 or later. Customers can create new virtual Clipper cards or transfer their existing plastic Clipper cards to Apple Wallet by using their iPhone's built-in NFC reader.

On May 19, 2021, the Clipper mobile app was released for Android, and Clipper became available in Google Pay. Phones must have an NFC chip and be running Android 5.0 (Lollipop) or later to be used for mobile payment.

Physical Clipper cards transferred to mobile wallets can no longer be reloaded or used to pay for fares, but will continue to work as keys to unlock Bay Wheels bikes and BikeLink bike lockers (see "" above). TransLink cards cannot be directly transferred to mobile wallets, as they cannot be read by the NFC reader inside a mobile phone. Clipper cards with a San Francisco State University Gator Pass or VTA SmartPass also cannot be transferred to mobile wallets.

See also

List of smart cards

References

External links

MTC TransLink Management Group Meeting Agendas and Materials

Contactless smart cards
Fare collection systems in the United States
Public transportation in San Francisco
Public transportation in San Mateo County, California
Public transportation in Santa Clara County, California
Public transportation in Alameda County, California
Public transportation in Contra Costa County, California
Public transportation in Marin County, California
Public transportation in Sonoma County, California
Transportation in Oakland, California